is the 46th NHK Taiga drama television series that began on January 7, 2007. It was aired throughout 2007, with the last episode aired December 16, 2007. Its official English title is The Trusted Confidant.

The story, to a large extent, was an adaptation of Yasushi Inoue's 1959 historical novel of the same title (published in English under the title The Samurai Banner of Furin Kazan). The four characters of the title, from left to right are wind, woods, fire, and mountain. The title is a reference to the war banner used by Takeda Shingen, which in turn was taken from Sun Tzu's The Art of War. It means "Swift as the Wind, Silent as a Forest, Fierce as Fire and Immovable as a Mountain."

Plot
Set in the Sengoku period, it depicts the life of Yamamoto Kansuke who is known as one of Takeda Shingen's renowned strategists.

Production

Production Credits
Director – Kazuhiko Shimizu
Screenwriter – Sumio Ōmori
Based on the novel by – Yasushi Inoue
Narrator – Sachiko Kagami
Music – Akira Senju
Titling – Kōji Kakinuma
Historical research – Shunroku Shibatsuji
Action director – Kunishirō Hayashi
Architectural research – Sei Hirai
Clothing research – Kiyoko Koizumi
Production coordinator – Hisaaki Wakaizumi

Starring

Yamamoto family
Yamamoto Kansuke: Masaaki Uchino
Mitsu: Shihori Kanjiya
Ritsu: Aki Maeda

Kuzukasa village
Kawaramura Denbei: Yoshiki Arizono
Hazuki: Juri Manase
Kuzukasa Takichi: Jiyuu Arima
Okuma: Aoi Asada
Yazaki Heizō: Ryuta Satō
Hisa: Asami Mizukawa

Takeda family
Takeda Shingen: Ichikawa Kamejirō
young Shingen and Suwa Katsuyori: Sōsuke Ikematsu
Princess Yū: Yuki Shibamoto
Lady Sanjō: Chizuru Ikewaki
Princess Ogoto: Mahiru Konno
Takeda Nobutora: Tatsuya Nakadai
Lady Ooi: Jun Fubuki
Takeda Nobushige: Noritoshi Kashiwa
Takeda Nobukado: Toshinobu Matsuo
Nene: Sachiko Sakurai
Takeda Yoshinobu: Ryo Kimura

Takeda Shingen's vassals
Itagaki Nobukata: Sonny Chiba
Amari Torayasu: Raita Ryu
Obu Toramasa: Akio Kaneda
Morozumi Torasada: Takeshi Katō
Oyamada Nobuari: Seiichi Tanabe
Baba Nobuharu: Kazuya Takahashi
Hara Toratane: Kai Shishido
Komai Masatake: Issei Takahashi
Kosaka Masanobu: Koutaro Tanaka
Yamagata Masakage: Yasuyuki Maekawa
Akiyama Nobutomo: Hidekazu Ichinose
Sanada Yukitaka: Kuranosuke Sasaki
Shinome: Misa Shimizu
Sanada Gengorō: Kaito Kobayashi
Aiki Ichibe: Yoshimasa Kondō
Akabe Shimotsuke: Susumu Terajima
Princess Miru: Yōko Maki
Shima: Akemi Omori
Hagino: Miyoko Asada
Kinu: Moeko Ezawa

Uesugi clan
Uesugi Kenshin: Gackt
Usami Sadamitsu: Ken Ogata
Naoe Sanetsuna: Tokuma Nishioka
Kakizaki Kageie: Kenichi Kaneda
Honjō Saneyori: Gen Kimura
Ōkuma Tomohide: Gorō Ōhashi
Momo: Naomi Nishida
Nami: Fusako Urabe
Uesugi Norimasa: Ichikawa Sadanji
Nagano Narimasa: Mantarō Koichi
Uesugi Sadazane: Mizuho Suzuki

Imagawa clan
Imagawa Yoshimoto: Shōsuke Tanihara
Jukeini: Shiho Fujimura
Taigen Sessai: Masatō Ibu
Imagawa Ujizane: Yukijirō Kazama
Ihara Tadatane: Renji Ishibashi
Matsudaira Motoyasu: Keisuke Sakamoto

Later Hōjō clan
Hōjō Ujiyasu: Makoto Matsui
Hōjō Ujitsuna: Tōru Shinagawa
Hōjō Ujimasa: Saotome Taichi
Hōjō Tsunashige: Tamotsu Ishibashi
Shimizu Yoshimasa: Tadashi Yokouchi

Other Daimyō of Shinano Province
Murakami Yoshikiyo: Toshiyuki Nagashima
Suwa Yorishige: Fumiyo Kohinata
Suwa Yoritaka: Kenshō Ono
Ogasawara Nagatoki: Akihiko Imai
Takatō Yoritsugu: Shōzō Uesugi
Kojima Gorozaemon: Nobuhiko Takada
Takanashi Masayori: Akira Otaka

Others
Aoki Daizen: Wataru Shihodō
Ofuku: Mako Midori
Oda Nobunaga: Jirō Sakuma
Seiin: Kei Satō
Hiraga Genshin: Shun Sugata

Episodes
Episode 1 - The One-Eyed Man
Episode 2 - Farewell, Birthplace
Episode 3 - Marici's Wife
Episode 4 - Demon of Vengeance
Episode 5 - Suruga Rebellion
Episode 6 - The Road to Employment
Episode 7 - Harunobu's First Battle
Episode 8 - Surprise Attack! Unnokuchi
Episode 9 - Kansuke's Death
Episode 10 - Harunobu Commits Treason
Episode 11 - Nobutora's Banishment
Episode 12 - Kansuke Gains Employment
Episode 13 - The Uninvited Man
Episode 14 - Flag of Sun Tzu
Episode 15 - The Invasion of Suwa
Episode 16 - The Fated Encounter
Episode 17 - The Princess' Tears
Episode 18 - To Live or to Die?
Episode 19 - The Cursed Flute
Episode 20 - Birth of a Tactician
Episode 21 - The Princess' Disappearance
Episode 22 - Clash of the Three Provinces
Episode 23 - Night Attack at Kawagoe
Episode 24 - The Dragon of Echigo
Episode 25 - A Cruel Law
Episode 26 - A Painful Victory
Episode 27 - The Strongest Enemy
Episode 28 - Death of Two Great Men
Episode 29 - Counterattack! The Takeda Army
Episode 30 - The Road Towards Subjugating the Country
Episode 31 - The Treacherous Castle
Episode 32 - Infiltrating Echigo
Episode 33 - Kansuke is Captured
Episode 34 - Sanada's Desire
Episode 35 - The Princess' Battle
Episode 36 - Women of Fate
Episode 37 - Mother's Will
Episode 38 - Subjugating Murakami
Episode 39 - Kawanakajima! Clash Between the Dragon and Tiger
Episode 40 - The Triple Alliance
Episode 41 - The Princess' Death
Episode 42 - The Tactician and the God of War
Episode 43 - Birth of Shingen
Episode 44 - Shingen's Assassination
Episode 45 - The Scheme! Okehazama
Episode 46 - The Kanto Expedition
Episode 47 - Night Before the Decisive Battle
Episode 48 - The Crucial Moment- Kawanakajima
Episode 49 - Desperate Struggle - Kawanakajima
Episode 50 - The Decisive Battle - Kawanakajima

Soundtrack and books

Soundtrack
Fūrin Kazan (EMI Music Japan)
Fūrin Kazan, Last Part (EMI Music Japan)

Books
Official guide
NHK Taiga Drama Story Fūrin Kazan First Part (December 20, 2006)
NHK Taiga Drama Story Fūrin Kazan Last Part (June 25, 2007)
NHK Taiga Drama, Historical handbook, Fūrin Kazan (December 2006)
Novel
NHK Taiga Drama 1, Volume of Wind (November 2006)
NHK Taiga Drama 2, Volume of Forest (March 2007)
NHK Taiga Drama 3, Volume of Fire (June 2007)
NHK Taiga Drama 4, Volume of Mountain (September 2007)

References

External links

 The Trusted Confidant at NEP Program Finder (in English)
 Taiga drama Fūrin Kazan at NHK Archives 
 46th work Furinkazan at NHK 
 

2007 Japanese television series debuts
2007 Japanese television series endings
Cultural depictions of Takeda Shingen
Cultural depictions of Sanada clan
Cultural depictions of Uesugi Kenshin
Cultural depictions of Oda Nobunaga
Cultural depictions of Tokugawa Ieyasu
Taiga drama
Television series set in the 16th century
Television shows based on Japanese novels